Lambulodes sericea is a moth of the family Erebidae. It was described by Walter Rothschild in 1912. It is found in Papua New Guinea and it is also found on Mount Goliath in Papua.

References

Lithosiina
Moths described in 1912